Dan-Patrick Poggenberg (born 28 March 1992) is a German footballer who plays as a defender for Bonner SC.

Career
He joined MSV Duisburg for the 2015–16 season. On 9 May 2018, it was announced that he will leave Duisburg at the end of the 2017–18 season. He signed for SG Sonnenhof Großaspach at the 2018–19 season. He signed for Fortuna Köln in July 2020.

References

External links

1992 births
People from Bad Oldesloe
Footballers from Schleswig-Holstein
Living people
German footballers
Association football defenders
Holstein Kiel players
Holstein Kiel II players
Chemnitzer FC players
VfL Wolfsburg II players
MSV Duisburg players
SG Sonnenhof Großaspach players
SC Fortuna Köln players
Bonner SC players
3. Liga players
2. Bundesliga players
Regionalliga players
Oberliga (football) players